George Henry Peters (1863–October 18, 1947) was a US astronomer and a discoverer of minor planets.

He worked at the U.S. Naval Observatory as an astrophotographer, discovering three asteroids and photographing the Sun's corona. He died in Washington, D.C.

References

External links 

Obituary 
 PASP 59 (1947) 344 (one paragraph)

1863 births
1947 deaths
American astronomers
Discoverers of asteroids

American people of Dutch descent